James Ian Mearns (born 21 April 1957) is a British Labour Party politician. He has been the Member of Parliament (MP) for Gateshead since the 2010 general election. He is a member of the Socialist Campaign Group parliamentary caucus.

Early life
Born in Newcastle upon Tyne to a World War II veteran, Mearns was raised Catholic and educated at St Mary's RC Primary School (Forest Hall) and having passed the 11 plus exam at St Mary's RC Technical school (Newcastle). He grew up supporting Newcastle United F.C., and has been a fan of the club for over 50 years.

Political origins
In the 1980s Mearns was a member and Northern Regional Chair of the Labour Party Young Socialists, and a supporter of the Militant Tendency. He ceased being a supporter of the group before becoming a Gateshead Councillor in 1983, serving as a Councillor for the Saltwell ward until 2010. During this period he chaired Gateshead Council's Education Committee and in the Council Cabinet before becoming Deputy Leader of the Council in 2002.

Parliamentary career
Mearns was elected to Parliament in 2010 with a majority of 12,549, in a Gateshead seat created by boundary changes. Along with fellow new North Eastern MPs Ian Lavery and Grahame Morris, Mearns is perceived to be on the left-wing of the Labour party. He was one of 16 signatories of an open letter to Ed Miliband in January 2015 calling on the party to commit to oppose further austerity, take rail franchises back into public ownership and strengthen collective bargaining arrangements.

In Parliament he has served on the Education Select Committee and the Backbench Business Committee in the 2010–2015 Parliament. He was a member of the bill committee for HS2, which he has criticised for treating residents of the north east and other regions not served by the line as "lesser citizens".

In March 2013, Mearns resigned as PPS to Ivan Lewis to defy the Labour whip and vote against the Jobseekers (Back to Work Schemes) Bill which retroactively changed DWP rules relating to Workfare in the United Kingdom.

On 19 June 2015, he was elected as the Chairman of the Backbench Business Select Committee.

On 24 February 2022, following the 2022 Russian invasion of Ukraine, Mearns was one of 11 Labour MPs threatened with losing the party whip after they signed a statement by the Stop the War Coalition which questioned the legitimacy of NATO and accused the military alliance of "eastward expansion". All 11 MPs subsequently removed their signatures.

References

External links
 Ian Mearns MP – official website
 

Living people
1957 births
Labour Party (UK) MPs for English constituencies
Politics of Gateshead
Councillors in Tyne and Wear
Militant tendency supporters
UK MPs 2010–2015
UK MPs 2015–2017
UK MPs 2017–2019
UK MPs 2019–present